Ransom C. Johnson (July 12, 1849October 7, 1904) was a Michigan politician.

Early life 
Johnson was born on July 12, 1849, in Mundy Township, Michigan.

Personal life 
Johnson was a member of Odd Fellows.

Career 
Johnson was a lawyer. Johnson was sworn in as a member of the Michigan Senate from the 13th district on January 2, 1895 and served until 1896.

Death 
Johnson died on October 7, 1904, in Flint, Michigan.

References 

1849 births
1904 deaths
Michigan lawyers
Republican Party Michigan state senators
19th-century American politicians
19th-century American lawyers